Udea decrepitalis is a moth of the family Crambidae described by Gottlieb August Wilhelm Herrich-Schäffer in 1848. It is found in most of Europe (except Iceland, Ireland, the Iberian Peninsula, the Benelux, Denmark, Greece, Bulgaria, Croatia, Hungary and Ukraine), east into Russia.

The wingspan is 23–27 mm. Adults are on wing from May to July.

The larvae feed on Dryopteris carthusiana.

External links
Fauna Europaea
UKMoths
Swedish Moths

decrepitalis
Moths of Europe
Moths described in 1848